Macrocheles glaber is a species of mite in the family Macrochelidae. It is found in Europe and New Zealand.

References

glaber
Articles created by Qbugbot
Animals described in 1860